Krishna Chandra College, commonly known as Hetampur College, established in 1897, is a government-affiliated college located at Hetampur in the Birbhum district of West Bengal, India. It claims to be the oldest college in the Birbhum district. It is affiliated to University of Burdwan and teaches science, commerce, and arts.

History
Maharani Padma Sundari Devi, the wife of Maharaja Ramranjan Chakraborty, established this college in 1896 in the name of her father-in-law Raja Krishna Chandra. This college is located in the heart of Hetampur village in the Birbhum district of West Bengal. This college functioned initially as an intermediate college, later in 1956 this college got permission to offer bachelor degree courses. Presently this college offers bachelor's degree courses in different branches of science, arts, and commerce.

Departments and courses

The college offers different undergraduate courses and aims at imparting education to the undergraduates of lower- and middle-class people of Hetampur and its adjoining areas.

Science
Science faculty consists of the departments of Physics, Chemistry, Mathematics, Botany, Zoology, and Economics.

Arts and Commerce
Arts and Commerce faculty consists of departments of Bengali, English, Sanskrit, History, Geography, Political Science, Philosophy, Education, and Commerce.

Accreditation
The college is recognized by the University Grants Commission (UGC). This college was accredited by the National Assessment and Accreditation Council (NAAC), and awarded B grade.

External links
https://kccollege.ac.in/

See also

References

Universities and colleges in Birbhum district
Colleges affiliated to University of Burdwan
Educational institutions established in 1897
1897 establishments in India